Bei may refer to:

 Chinese stelae (bēi)
 Bei River, a tributary of the Pearl River in southern China
 Bei (surname) (贝/貝), a Chinese surname
 (mathematics) bei, a Kelvin function
 Yelü Bei (899–937), Khitan prince (Yelü being his clan name)

See also
 BEI (disambiguation)
 Bey